This page provides a link to detailed lists of these moths by family.

Macro moths
 Hepialidae
 Cossidae
 Zygaenidae
 Limacodidae
 Sesiidae
 Lasiocampidae
 Saturniidae
 Endromidae
 Drepanidae
 Thyatiridae
 Geometridae
 Sphingidae
 Notodontidae
 Thaumetopoeidae
 Lymantriidae
 Arctiidae
 Ctenuchidae
 Nolidae
 Noctuidae

Micro moths
 Micromoths

See also 
List of butterflies of Israel

References 
Israel Insect World

 

Moths
Israel
Israel